Bozgodar-e Sofla (also Romanized as Bozgodār-e Soflá; also known as Bozgodār-e Pā’īn) is a village in Dorudfaraman Rural District, in the Central District of Kermanshah County, Kermanshah Province, Iran. At the 2006 census, its population was 152, in 35 families.

References 

Populated places in Kermanshah County